Rodrigo Germán Aliendro (born 16 February 1991) is an Argentine professional footballer who plays as a midfielder for Argentine Primera División side River Plate.

Career
Aliendro made his debut for Chacarita Juniors in a Copa Argentina tie against San Lorenzo on 15 March 2012. His league debut came in Primera B Nacional five days later versus Instituto, another appearance came against Gimnasia in a season that ended in relegation for them. Thirteen appearances and one goal followed in three seasons in the Primera B Metropolitana, ten of those appearances were in Chacarita's promotion-winning campaign of 2014. In the second of those three seasons, Aliendro left to sign for Ituzaingó of Primera D Metropolitana on loan. He scored three goals in thirty-two games for Ituzaingó.

In 2016, Aliendro joined Argentine Primera División side Atlético Tucumán on loan. He made his top-flight debut on 14 February versus Boca Juniors. A few weeks previous, Aliendro made his continental debut in the 2017 Copa Libertadores against El Nacional. Atlético Tucumán signed Aliendro permanently on 6 July 2017.

In June 2019, it was confirmed that Aliendro had joined Colón.

Career statistics
.

References

External links

1991 births
Living people
Sportspeople from Buenos Aires Province
Argentine footballers
Association football midfielders
Chacarita Juniors footballers
Club Atlético Ituzaingó players
Atlético Tucumán footballers
Club Atlético Colón footballers
Club Atlético River Plate footballers
Primera Nacional players
Primera B Metropolitana players
Primera D Metropolitana players
Argentine Primera División players